The Luzon wart frog (Fejervarya vittigera) is a species of frog in the family Dicroglossidae.
It is endemic to the Philippines where it occurs on all the major islands. It is an abundant and common species occurring in a range of man-made habitats, such as agricultural areas, ditches, artificial ponds and lakes. It uses nearly any body of available water for breeding.

References

Fejervarya
Amphibians of the Philippines
Endemic fauna of the Philippines
Taxonomy articles created by Polbot
Amphibians described in 1834